Christian Gombe (born 22 February 1962) is a Central African basketball player. He competed at the 1988 Summer Olympics with the Central African Republic national basketball team.

References

1962 births
Living people
Basketball players at the 1988 Summer Olympics
Central African Republic men's basketball players
Olympic basketball players of the Central African Republic